The Miller Inquiry was a Kenya judicial commission appointed to inquire into allegations involving former attorney general of Kenya Charles Mugane Njonjo. The commission was chaired by Cecil Henry Ethelwood Miller.

Membership
The tribunal consisted of:
 Cecil Henry Ethelwood Miller – chairman

The prosecution was led by Lee Muthoga, with the defence led by William Deverell and Paul Muite.

See also
 Attorney General of Kenya

References

Politics of Kenya
Legal history of Kenya
Corruption in Kenya